Tai Wan Tau is a village Clear Water Bay, in the Sai Kung District of Hong Kong.

Geography
Tai Wan Tau is a small village close to the sea, in the northeast of Clear Water Bay First Beach. The Tai Leng Tung hill is located at the back of the village.

Administration
Tai Wan Tau (including Tai Au Mun) is a recognized village under the New Territories Small House Policy.

History
The village was established during the reign of the Wanli Emperor (1572-1620). It was established by members of the Lau and Chow clans. Many of the members later moved to the nearby village of Tai Au Mun, in the northwest. The Laus historically engaged in fishing and rice growing.

At the time of the 1911 census, the population of Tai Wan Tau was 117. The number of males was 53.

Features
An ancestral hall of the Laus is located in the village. The house at No. 23 Tai Wan Tau, built before 1907 and rebuilt in 1949, is a Chinese Eclectic style building.

References

External links

 Delineation of area of existing village Tai Wan Tau (Hang Hau) for election of resident representative (2019 to 2022). Note that the area covers Tai Au Mun.
 Antiquities Advisory Board. Pictures of No. 23 Tai Wan Tau

Villages in Sai Kung District, Hong Kong
Clear Water Bay